The 2021 Sioux Chief PowerPEX 200 presented by Scott County Tourism was the 19th stock car race of the 2021 ARCA Menards Series, the tenth and final race of the 2021 Sioux Chief Showdown, and the 25th iteration of the event. The race was held on Saturday, October 2, 2021 in Salem, Indiana at Salem Speedway, a  permanent paved oval-shaped racetrack. The race took the scheduled 200 laps to complete. On the final restart on lap 156, Jesse Love of Venturini Motorsports would take the lead and lead every lap afterwards to win his first career ARCA Menards Series win and his only win of the season. Meanwhile, Ty Gibbs of Joe Gibbs Racing, who would finish second, would win the 2021 Sioux Chief Showdown championship, winning the championship by 22 points. To fill out the podium, Rajah Caruth of Rev Racing would finish third.

Background 
Salem Speedway is a .555 miles (0.893 km) long paved oval motor racetrack in Washington Township, Washington County, near Salem, Indiana, approximately 100 miles (160 km) south of Indianapolis. The track has 33° degrees of banking in the corners. Major auto racing series that run at Salem are ARCA and USAC.

Entry list

Practice 
The only 45-minute practice session was held on Saturday, October 2, at 3:15 PM EST.

Qualifying 
Qualifying was held on Saturday, October 2, at 5:30 PM EST. Each driver would have two laps to set their fastest lap; whichever lap was fastest would be considered their official lap time.

Full qualifying results

Race results

References 

2021 ARCA Menards Series
Sioux Chief PowerPEX 200
Sioux Chief PowerPEX 200